The Ayesha is an advanced pole dance position, where the dancer suspends their body weight with two hands in an inverted position, and opens their legs in a V facing the pole.

There are several grip variations for the Ayesha, including a split grip, twisted grip, and elbow grip. There are different ways to get into an ayesha: from a basic inversion, by doing a caterpillar to create space between the torso and the pole; from an extended butterfly, bringing the inside leg around toward the face; or directly from a handspring.

References

Dance moves